Julamri Bin Muhammad (born 18 October 1985) is a Malaysian footballer who plays for PDRM FA in Malaysia Premier League as a left back and sometimes as a left midfielder.

References

1985 births
Living people
Malaysian footballers
People from Sabah
Sabah F.C. (Malaysia) players
PDRM FA players
Association football midfielders
Association football fullbacks